Cue was an electoral district of the Legislative Assembly in the Australian state of Western Australia from 1901 to 1930.

The district was located in the Western Australian outback. Upon its creation in 1900 it included the towns of Cue, Day Dawn, Mainland, Austin, Cuddingwarra, Gabanintha and Tuckanarra. It was held by the Labor Party for all but the first term of its existence.

Members for Cue

Election results

References

Cue
1901 establishments in Australia
Constituencies established in 1901
1930 disestablishments in Australia
Constituencies disestablished in 1930